Cidaris is a genus of pencil sea urchins.

Species 

According to the World Register of Marine Species (WoRMS), the genus Cidaris contains the following extant species 
Cidaris abyssicola (Agassiz, 1869)
Cidaris annulata (Gray, 1855)
Cidaris baculosa (Lamarck, 1816)
Cidaris blakei (Agassiz 1878)
Cidaris cidaris (Linnaeus, 1758)
Cidaris mabahissae (Mortensen, 1939)
Cidaris nuda (Mortensen, 1903)
Cidaris rugosa (Clark, 1907)
Cidaris thouarsii (Agassiz & Desor, 1846)

Extinct species or names brought to synonymy 

 †Cidaris aculeata
 †Cidaris aialensis
 †Cidaris alpina
 †Cidaris alternata
 †Cidaris austriaca
 †Cidaris avena
 †Cidaris biconica
 †Cidaris biformis
 †Cidaris braunii
 †Cidaris buchii
 †Cidaris caudex
 †Cidaris cingulata
 †Cidaris coralliophila
 †Cidaris costalarensis
 †Cidaris costata
 †Cidaris costeanensis
 †Cidaris decorata
 †Cidaris decoratissima
 †Cidaris dorsata
 †Cidaris ecki
 †Cidaris elegans Munster, 1826
 †Cidaris elegans Agassiz, 1879, synonym for Histocidaris elegans
 †Cidaris forminensis
 †Cidaris fustis
 †Cidaris glabra
 †Cidaris hausmanni
 †Cidaris lanceata
 †Cidaris linearis
 †Cidaris milierensis
 †Cidaris ovata
 †Cidaris perplexa
 †Cidaris petersii
 †Cidaris plana
 †Cidaris pyramidalis
 †Cidaris quadrialata
 †Cidaris quadriserrata
 †Cidaris regnyi
 †Cidaris remifera
 †Cidaris remifera
 †Cidaris reticulata
 †Cidaris schwageri
 †Cidaris scrobiculata
 †Cidaris seelandica
 †Cidaris semicostata
 †Cidaris similis
 †Cidaris spinachristi
 †Cidaris spongiosa
 †Cidaris stipes
 †Cidaris stoppanii
 †Cidaris sulcata
 †Cidaris tenuicostata
 †Cidaris tetraedrica
 †Cidaris transversa
 †Cidaris trapezoidalis
 †Cidaris trigona
 †Cidaris triserrata
 †Cidaris undulatus
 †Cidaris valparolae
 †Cidaris verticillata
 †Cidaris verticillata
 †Cidaris waechteri
 †Cidaris wissmanni
 †Cidaris zardini

References 

Cidaridae
Cidaroida genera
Extant Triassic first appearances